Kiwi Time is an American rock band previously based in San Francisco and now living in Los Angeles, California. Originally four childhood friends from Belarus the band is known for standing up for human rights around the globe and giving its support to Russian human rights activists during the 2014 Winter Olympics in Sochi. Kiwi Time performed in venues such as the Great American Music Hall, SLIMs, The Viper Room, 111 Minna Gallery, Elbo Room, Supperclub, DNA Lounge, Cafe Cocomo, Broadway Studios, and Brick & Mortar Music Hall.

History

Originally childhood friends from town Byaroza, Belarus (a former Soviet republic) the band members relocated to San Francisco seeking opportunities to "live the American dream"  as musicians and due to political and social issues in Eastern Europe. Liberated by their new San Francisco home, the band, a taut unit of musicians and songwriters weaned on American indie rock were able to create more freely. A live wall of sound, Kiwi Time is built on raw-boned energy and the unflinching focus of lead singer and guitarist Yoga Shyp, the unstoppable rhythm section of singer/bassist, Anna Makovchik and drummer Vlad Kukharchuk, and the swirling vibrations of Mikalai Skrobat on keyboards and guitar.

In 2013, Kiwi Time signed with Granted Access Inc., a music label, the Bay Area's premier music and video label and production studios, a division of Baynetwork Inc., one of Silicon Valley's top IT hardware re-sellers and managed IT service companies. Their 5 track EP "It’s Kiwi Time"  was produced by Dan Shea (producer) who is known for his work with Mariah Carey, Janet Jackson, Carlos Santana, Rob Thomas, Bono, Robin Thicke, Martina McBride and many others. As a producer, composer, and multi-instrumentalist, Dan Shea's albums have sold over 150 million copies worldwide.  The new release infuses a memorable dance-rock rhythm with the energy of their live show.

In September 2014, the band performed in Los Angeles's legendary The Viper Room.
And in Jan 2015 was named by Emerging bands magazine as one of the top 100 bands in the world to make it in 2015.

Collaborations

In the summer of 2014, the band collaborated with legendary hip-hop producer and artist Sir Mix-a-Lot on a track called "If I Can" that was released in early November.

Awards and recognition

In 2013, Kiwi Time were the winners of the Stoneski Battle of the Bands. In 2014, the band won first place at the ArtRockX band competition. They also headlined at the Red Marines Music Festival and have played shows in Los Angeles and New York. As a result, the band was featured on Live 105's Top Ten Local Bands in San Francisco.

They have been named one of the ten best local alternative rock bands in San Francisco by the alternative station Live 105 FM.

See also

 List of alternative rock artists

References

External links
 

Alternative rock groups from California
Musical groups established in 2011
Musical groups from San Francisco
Musical quartets
American pop rock music groups
2011 establishments in California